Canadian Armed Forces (CAF) divers are specialists trained to conduct underwater operations within their respective environmental commands. Divers within the CAF are qualified into sub-categories of diving. Be it a member of a diving team or a CAF member who is maintaining currency and qualification through casual diving. Divers within the CAF are trained as Clearance Divers (CL Diver), Search and Rescue Technicians (SAR), Port Inspection Divers (PID), Ship's Team Divers, and Combat Divers.

Training
The CAF training agencies authorized to conduct CAF diving training are:

 Fleet Diving Unit (Atlantic) (FDU (A));
 Fleet Diving Unit (Pacific) (FDU (P)); and
 Army Dive Centre (ADC).

Clearance divers
Royal Canadian Navy Clearance Divers are trained to conduct a wide variety of diving operations.  These include the use of traditional open circuit (SCUBA) diving equipment, lightweight portable surface supplied diving systems, commercial grade mixed gas surface supplied diving systems, mixed gas rebreather systems (such as the CCDA and CUMA sets) as well as fixed and portable hyperbaric chambers.

Canada currently has two operational diving units; RCN Clearance Diving Officers, and  Clearance Divers and Port Inspection Divers  who perform a variety of core capabilities, as outlined in their Naval Diving Operational Concept of Employment (ND OCE) terms of reference. These core capabilities are:
 Battle Damage Repair (BDR)
 Maritime Explosive Ordnance Disposal (MEOD)
 Mine Counter-Measures (MCM)
 Force Protection Support (FPS)

They also perform a number of secondary or support functions to these core capabilities include but are not limited to:
 Improvised Explosive Device Disposal (IEDD) for devices found in military establishments within defined areas of responsibility in Canada;
 Submarine Search and Rescue (SUBSAR) first line response (RCC and light-weight Surface Supplied Diving equipment)
 Second line response (ROVs and/or diving);
 Provision of a minimum six-person 45 metre CABA diving team on each coast for emergencies;
 Diving Support Roles (which amplifies Para 13 b.) consist of:
 Underwater ship and infrastructure maintenance
 Light salvage
 Seabed search
 Underwater demolitions
 Inspection, maintenance and repair of critical diver life support equipment
 Operation of Working Class Remote Operated Vehicle (ROV), Inspection Class ROV, ROV Simulator, Diver Evaluation Systems, and side scan sonar (SSS)
 Support for medical treatment in hyperbaric chamber
 Support to JTF2
 Operating the Experimental Diving Unit (EDU) at DRDC Toronto in support of R&D efforts related to CF diving activities

The two operational naval diving units are:
 Fleet Diving Unit Pacific based at CFB Esquimalt, British Columbia.
 Fleet Diving Unit Atlantic based near Halifax in CFB Shearwater, Nova Scotia.

The Royal Canadian Clearance Diver motto is "Strength in depth".

Clearance Diving Officers and Divers also serve at:
 the Experimental Diving Unit (EDU) at Defence Research and Development Canada
 the EOD School in CFB Gagetown, New Brunswick.
 Director of Diving Safety (D Dive S), at the National Defence Headquarters (NDHQ) in Ottawa, Ontario.
Royal Canadian Navy Clearance Divers' Prayer

On 30 April 2015 the RCN Clearance Diving Branch adopted the following prayer as their official branch prayer.  The prayer was originally written by Padre David Jackson, the unit chaplain of Fleet Diving Unit Atlantic, for the occasion of the 60th Anniversary of the RCN Clearance Diving Branch.  The prayer is based on Psalm 146:6 & 139:9-10 and also incorporates the branch motto "Strength in Depth".
 English: Lord God Almighty, who made heaven and earth, the sea, and all that is in them; we ask You to look with favour upon us, the members of the Royal Canadian Navy Clearance Diving Branch, that as we dwell in the uttermost parts of the sea, even there Your hand may lead us and Your right hand may hold us.  Be our strength in depth and preserve us from all the perils of the sea and the assaults of the enemy; that we may serve Queen, Country and Branch with loyalty, courage and honour.  Amen.
 French: Dieu Tout-Puissant, Toi qui a créé le ciel et la terre, la mer avec tout ce qu'elle contient; Nous te demandons de tourner ton regard vers nous les membres de la Branche des Plongeurs Démineurs de la Marine Royale Canadienne surtout lorsque nous sommes dans les profondeurs de la mer.  Là aussi ta main puisse nous conduire, Et ta droite nous saisir. Sois notre force dans les profondeurs et préserve-nous de tous les dangers de la mer et de nos ennemis; pour que nous puissions servir la Reine, notre pays et la Branche avec loyauté, courage et honneur. Amen
(See Professional diving.)

Combat divers

History  
Diving in the Canadian Army began in the 1960s when, as a result of the introduction of amphibious vehicles, it was essential to provide a diving capability to the safety organization for the swimming of the vehicles. Amphibious operations also required a better capability for the underwater reconnaissance of crossing sites. Following trials in 1966, diving sections were established in engineer units in 1969. Once the diving capability was established, additional tasks were added to make combat diving an extension of combat engineering into the water. Other tasks such as obstacle construction and breaching, employing and detecting landmines and limited underwater construction were added to the safety standby and reconnaissance tasks.

General Description

Combat divers provide the Army with the capability of performing combat engineer tasks underwater. They generally conduct tasks as part of the combined arms team; however, if required, they have the ability to execute tasks independently. Combat divers are combat engineers who perform combat diving as a secondary duty. They are grouped into mission-specific teams when a task is identified and ordered, to support operations.

Niche area
Combat divers do the majority of their work on inland waterways, either on the surface or beneath the water with breathing apparatus. They usually work close to shorelines and riverbanks because that is where the rest of the army will be conducting operations. At times the combat divers will work in salt water to support Army operations. In some circumstances, combat divers can be used to conduct reconnaissance in the face of enemy forces. They would be doing this reconnaissance with the support of the manoeuvre forces, which could assist the dive team with observation and suppressive fire.

Canada's Combat Divers are an Occupation Sub-Specialization (OSS) in its Army Combat Engineer Regiments.

References

External links
Canadian Forces Diving
DAOD 8009-1, Canadian Forces Diving - Organization and Operating Principles
Canadian Naval Divers Association
Physical Fitness Standards for CF Diving Personnel
Fleet Diving Unit (Pacific)

Armed forces diving
Canadian Military Engineers
Combat diving
Special forces of Canada